1965–66 was the 19th season of the Western International Hockey League. 

Prior to the commencement of the 1965–66 WIHL season it was announced that the Cranbrook Royals would be added to the league, with the result being that the WIHL would comprise six teams. In addition to the Washington-based Spokane Jets, the other teams that made up the 1965-66 version of the WIHL were the British Columbia-based Kimberley Dynamiters, Nelson Maple Leafs, Rossland Warriors and Trail Smoke Eaters.

Standings

 Spokane Jets		            50		33	14	 3				264	178		 69
 Nelson Maple Leafs 	            50		31	15	 4				253	186		 66
 Kimberley Dynamiters	            50		31	18	 1				318	207		 63
 Rossland Warriors		    50		20	27	 3				220	255		 43
 Trail Smoke Eaters		    50		21	29	 0				229	271		 42
 Cranbrook Royals		    50		 8	41	 1				178	365		 17

Playoffs

Semi finals (best of 7)
 Kimberley defeated Nelson 4 games to 0 (5-4, 2-9, 6-2, 3-1, 1-9, 4-3 2OT)
 Spokane defeated Rossland 4 games to 1 (8-3, 4-5 OT, 5-2, 8-3, 5-3)

Final (best of 7)
 Kimberley defeated Spokane 4 games to 1 (5-4, 2-1, 1-5, 5-4, 5-0)

The Kimberley Dynamiters advanced to the 1965-66 Western Canada Allan Cup Playoffs.

References 

The Spokesman-Review - 20 Apr 1965
The Spokesman-Review - 21 Apr 1965
The Spokesman-Review - 9 May 1965
The Spokesman-Review - 23 Jul 1965
The Spokesman-Review - 3 Oct 1965
The Spokesman-Review - 12 Oct 1965
The Spokesman-Review - 17 Dec 1965

Western International Hockey League seasons
Wihl
Wihl